The 2008 IIHF Inline Hockey World Championship was the 12th IIHF Inline Hockey World Championship, an international inline hockey tournament run by the International Ice Hockey Federation. The World Championship runs alongside the 2008 IIHF Inline Hockey World Championship Division I tournament and took place between 21 and 28 June 2008 in Bratislava, Slovakia. The tournament was won by Sweden, earning their second straight World Championship title and fourth overall. Slovakia finished in second place and Germany in third after defeating the United States in the bronze medal match. Austria, after losing the seventh place game against Slovenia was relegated to Division I for 2009. The event chairman was Hans Dobida.

Seeding and groups
The seeding in the preliminary round was based on the final standings at the 2007 IIHF Inline Hockey World Championship. The World Championship groups are named Group A and Group B while the 2008 IIHF Inline Hockey World Championship Division I tournament uses Group C and Group D, as both tournaments were held in Bratislava, Slovakia. The teams were grouped accordingly by seeding at the previous year's tournament (in parenthesis is the corresponding seeding):

Group A
 (1)
 (4)
 (5)
 (8)

Group B
 (2)
 (3)
 (6)
 (7)

Preliminary round
Eight participating teams were placed in the following two groups. After playing a round-robin, the top three teams in each group advance to the playoff round. The last team in each group compete in the qualifying round where they face-off against the top ranked teams of Group C and Group D from the Division I tournament for a chance to participate in the Top Division playoffs.

All times are local (UTC+2).

Group A

Group B

Qualifying round
Austria and Germany advanced to the qualifying round after finishing last in Group A and Group B respectively. Austria faced off against Great Britain, who finished first in Group C of the Division I tournament, and Germany was drawn against Canada, who finished first in Group D of the Division I tournament, for a chance to participate in the Top Division playoffs. Both Austria and Germany won their matches and advanced to the Top Division playoffs, while Great Britain and Canada advanced to the Division I playoffs.

All times are local (UTC+2).

Playoff round
Germany and Austria advanced to the playoff round after winning their qualifying round matches. They were seeded alongside the six other teams of the tournament based on their results in the preliminary round. The four winning quarterfinalists advanced to the semifinals while the losing teams moved on to the placement round. Austria was relegated to Division I for 2009 after losing the seventh place game against Slovenia, while the Czech Republic finished fifth after defeating Finland in the fifth place game. In the semifinals the Slovakia defeated Germany and Sweden beat the United States, both advancing to the gold medal game. After losing the semifinals the United States and Germany played off for the bronze medal with Germany winning 8–7. Sweden defeated Slovakia 7–3 in the gold medal game, earning their second straight World Championship title and fourth overall.

Draw

Quarterfinals

Placement round

5th place game

7th place game

Semifinals

Bronze medal game

Gold medal game

Ranking and statistics

Tournament awards
Best players selected by the directorate:
Best Goalkeeper:  Sasu Hovi
Best Defenseman:  Lee Sweatt
Best Forward:  Linus Klasen
Most Valuable Player:  Dick Axelsson

Final standings
The final standings of the tournament according to IIHF:

Scoring leaders

List shows the top 10 skaters sorted by points, then goals. If the list exceeds 10 skaters because of a tie in points, all of the tied skaters are left out. Games from the qualifying round do not count towards the Division I statistics.

Leading goaltenders

Only the top five goaltenders, based on save percentage, who have played at least 40% of their team's minutes are included in this list. Games from the qualifying round do not count towards the Division I statistics.

References

External links
World Championship at IIHF.com

2008 in Slovak sport
Iihf Inline Hockey World Championship, 2008
IIHF InLine Hockey World Championship
Inline hockey in Slovakia
I
June 2008 sports events in Europe
Sports competitions in Bratislava